Why Buddhism is True: The Science and Philosophy of Meditation and Enlightenment is a 2017 book by Robert Wright. As of August 2017, the book had peaked at The New York Times No. 4 bestseller in hardcover nonfiction.

Content

In Why Buddhism is True, Wright advocates a secular, Westernized form of Buddhism focusing on the practice of mindfulness meditation and stripped of supernatural beliefs such as reincarnation. He further argues that more widespread practice of meditation could lead to a more reflective and empathetic population and reduce political tribalism. In line with his background, Wright draws heavily on evolutionary biology and evolutionary psychology to defend Buddhism's diagnosis of the causes of human suffering. He argues the modern psychological idea of the modularity of mind resonates with the Buddhist teaching of no-self (anatman).

Reception
Why Buddhism is True received a number of positive reviews from major publications. A review in The New Yorker by Adam Gopnik stated, "Wright’s book has no poetry or paradox anywhere in it. [...] Yet, if you never feel that Wright is telling you something profound or beautiful, you also never feel that he is telling you something untrue. Direct and unambiguous, tracing his own history in meditation practice—which eventually led him to a series of weeklong retreats and to the intense study of Buddhist doctrine—he makes Buddhist ideas and their history clear."

The neuroscientist Antonio Damasio, reviewing the book in The New York Times, wrote, "Wright's book is provocative, informative and, in many respects, deeply rewarding." Kirkus Reviews called the book a "cogent and approachable argument for a personal meditation practice based on secular Buddhist principles." Adam Frank, writing for National Public Radio, called it "delightfully personal, yet broadly important".

The Washington Post gave a more mixed review, writing that "while [Wright] does not make a fully convincing case for some of his more grandiose claims about truth and freedom, his argument contains many interesting and illuminating points."

In 2020, Evan Thompson questioned what he called Buddhist exceptionalism, "the belief that Buddhism is superior to other religions... or that Buddhism isn't really a religion but rather is a kind of 'mind science,' therapy, philosophy, or a way of life based on meditation." Thompson questioned both Wright's version of secularized and naturalized Buddhism and, conversely, Wright's conception of evolutionary psychology that Wright claims Buddhism is uniquely equipped to address.

See also 
 Waking Up: A Guide to Spirituality Without Religion by Sam Harris
 Zen and the Art of Consciousness by Susan Blackmore
 Altered Traits: Science Reveals How Meditation Changes Your Mind, Brain, and Body by Daniel Goleman and Richard Davidson
 Stephen Batchelor (author)
 Joseph Goldstein (writer)
 Sharon Salzberg
 Shinzen Young
 Jon Kabat-Zinn
 Judson A. Brewer
 Bhikkhu Bodhi

References

External links
 Interview about the book with Wright by Vox

2017 non-fiction books
Books about Buddhism
Books by Robert Wright (journalist)
Simon & Schuster books